Founded in 1980, the NZ Native Forests Restoration Trust is an organisation involved in forest restoration.

The Trust acquires land to protect important species, restore their habitats and to improve the quality of waterways. It now has 28 reserves throughout the North Island and 2 in the South Island totalling over 7,000ha of protected native forests.

Sir Edmund Hillary was the foundation patron of the trust until his death in 2008. Sir Paul Reeves then became patron until his death in 2011.

The Trust publishes its Canopy newsletter twice a year.

See also
 List of environmental organizations

References

External links
 Official Native Forest Restoration Trust website

Nature conservation organisations based in New Zealand
Forest conservation organizations
Forests of New Zealand
Reforestation
Environmental organizations established in 1980
1980 establishments in New Zealand